Nobody's Fault or Nobody's Fault But Mine may refer to:
 "Nobody's Fault" (Aerosmith song) (1976)
 "Nobody's Fault" (Sakurazaka46 song) (2020)
 "Nobody's Fault" (House), a 2012 episode of House
 "It's Nobody's Fault but Mine", a 1927 song by Blind Willie Johnson and adapted by Led Zeppelin
 Nobody's Fault But Mine (album), a 1986 album by Martin Simpson
 "Nobody's Fault but My Own", a 1998 song by Beck